Northwestern Consolidated Milling Company was an American flour milling company that operated about one-quarter of the mills in Minneapolis, Minnesota, when the city was the flour milling capital of the world. Formed as a business entity, Northwestern produced flour for the half-century between 1891 and 1953, when its AMill was converted to storage and light manufacturing. At its founding, Northwestern was the city's and the world's second-largest flour milling company after Pillsbury, with what is today General Mills a close third. The company became one of three constituents of a Minneapolis oligopoly that owned almost nine percent of the country's flour and grist production and products by 1905. This occurred as a result of their attempt at a United States monopoly.

History  

Technological advances in flour milling were already in place by the 1880s, when18 different millers operated in Minneapolis. From that point on and for the next 50 years, mergers and changes in business administration were the primary developments in the industry.

Northwestern and their new Ceresota flour brand name were established in July 1891 by a group of businessmen led by former lumberman John Martin at six independent existing mills—the Crown Roller (2,500 barrels/day), Columbia (2,000), Northwestern (1,600), Pettit (1,600, to be an elevator), Galaxy (1,500) and Zenith (1,100). Martin became president, JoelB. Bassett was vice president, C.T. Fox was secretary and treasurer, and FredC. Pillsbury, E.Zeidler and AlbertC. Loring were the managers. The company grew to nine mills and several elevator and storage facilities. Loring's father Charles M. Loring was one of the directors.

Northwestern's first decade was marked by financial instability because its founders paid too much for its properties and suffered from lack of capital. Areorganization followed in 1895 that somewhat alleviated the company's problems. In 18981899 the United States Milling Company formed at the Hecker-Jones-Jewell mills in New York City with the goal of becoming a flour monopoly by owning nearly all of the country's spring wheat mills. Northwestern, though, was the only company they acquired. Financially troubled, U.S. Milling in 1900 reorganized and became the Standard Milling Company with Northwestern as a subsidiary.

By combining six mills, Northwestern's capacity was the second largest in the world at the time of its founding, after the giant Pillsbury-Washburn, and slightly more than Washburn, Crosby. By 1900, these three companies were an oligopoly holding 97 percent of the Minneapolis market. In 1928 Washburn, Crosby became General Mills in a merger of U.S. millers and surpassed Pillsbury to become the world's largest flour milling company. In recent years General Mills acquired Pillsbury.

In January 1909, Northwestern opened its state of the art Elevator A, possibly the largest grain elevator ever built of brick. The elevator could hold 1,000,000 bushels of grain and its conveyors could each move 10,000 bushels per hour to the Crown Roller and Standard mills. Along with ElevatorB known as the Pettit Mill of which only the foundation remains, Almost all the properties in this article are contributing resources to the Saint Anthony Falls Historic District which is on the National Register of Historic Places.

Ceresota brand  

The company named Ceresota Flour for an invented son of the Greek goddess Ceres, Ceres Ota. The advertising story described a young boy exploring earth in a costume of gifts from different countries. An Egyptian king provided his trousers; from Italy, he got his blue blanket; the Amazon contributed his bench, boots, suspenders, and shirt; Japan gave him a gold shield; and a miller gifted him with the brown sombrero. Each Ceresota Flour sack displayed a picture of Ceres Ota slicing a giant loaf of bread. 

Ceresota is now a brand name of The Uhlmann Company and American Home Foods.

Today 

After the center of U.S. flour milling moved to the east coast, the company's AandF Mills closed during the 1940s and 1950s. Of the 34 Minneapolis flour mills, only four are still standing on the Mississippi's west bank. Of the four, the Crown Roller Mill and the Standard Mill were Northwestern mills (the AandF mills). Of concern to preservationists, Omni Investment had plans to build a condominium development on top of the remains of the Northwestern Bmill and adjacent archaeological sites but the plan is stopped and is now in the court system.
ElevatorA was converted to an office building in 1987, and converted again about 2015 to Millers Landing Senior Living.

Crown Roller Mill is in use today as an office building. The Standard Mill became the Whitney Hotel but is closed.

Mills

See also  

 Ceresota Building
 History of Minneapolis
 List of contributing properties in the St. Anthony Falls Historic District

References

Further reading 

 
 Anfinson, Scott F. (1989). Archaeology of the Central Minneapolis Riverfront, Part 1 and Part 2. Retrieved on April 14, 2007.

External links  

 Historic American Engineering Record (HAER) documentation, filed under Minneapolis, Hennepin County, MN:
 
 
 
 

Defunct companies based in Minneapolis
Food and drink companies established in 1891
Flour mills in the United States
Grinding mills in Minnesota
Grinding mills on the National Register of Historic Places in Minnesota
Historic American Engineering Record in Minnesota
National Register of Historic Places in Minneapolis
1891 establishments in Minnesota
Food and drink companies disestablished in 1953
1953 disestablishments in Minnesota